The Kwomtari–Fas languages, often referred to ambiguously as Kwomtari, are an apparently spurious language family proposal of six languages spoken by some 4,000 people in the north of Papua New Guinea, near the border with Indonesia. The term "Kwomtari languages" can also refer to one of the established families that makes up this proposal.

Classification history

Loving and Bass (1964)
A "Kwomtari" (= Kwomtari–Fas) phylum was first proposed by Loving and Bass (1964). The following classification is based on their proposal, with the addition of the Pyu and language, added by Laycock (1975):

Kwomtari–Fas phylum
Kwomtari–Nas family: Kwomtari, Nai (Biaka)
Fas family: Fas, Baibai

Laycock (1975)
Laycock (1973; 1975) grouped the languages differently, placing Kwomtari and Fas together in the "Kwomtari family", and Baibai and Nai (Biaka) together in a "Baibai family", and calling the overall grouping "Kwomtari–Baibai". Laycock also added the Pyu isolate, though he admitted, "A great deal more work is required on the Kwomtari Phylum before the classification can be regarded as established" (1973:43), and he published no evidence.

Kwomtari–Baibai phylum (spurious)
Kwomtari–Fas family: Kwomtari, Fas
Baibai–Biaka family: Baibai, Nai (Biaka)
Pyu isolate

Baron (1983)
However, Baron (1983) notes that Laycock's reclassification appears to have been due to an alignment error in the published comparative data of Loving & Bass. Their raw field notes support their original classification: They found a Swadesh list of Kwomtari to have 45% cognates with Biaka (Nai), while they note that Baibai has only 3% cognates with Biaka, and so cannot be assigned to the same family. Compare (Baron 1983:5 converted to IPA):

Baron coined the name "Kwomtari–Fas" to explicitly correct "Kwomtari–Baibai", the name under which Laycock's arrangement was commonly known. Baron added a newly discovered language, Guriaso, as a divergent branch of the Kwomtari family proper, and noted that as of that date Laycock maintained the inclusion of Pyu. However, Baron believes there is little to suggest that the Kwomtari family, Fas family, and Pyu are actually related, except that Kwomtari and Fas use similar kinship terms, which are shared by neighboring families that are not thought to be related to either Kwomtari or Fas.

Ross (2005)
Malcolm Ross linked Laycock's Kwomtari–Baibai family to the small Left May (Arai) family in a Left May – Kwomtari proposal, which is based on common pronouns. However, the link appears less straightforward once the correction is made for Loving and Bass' data. See Left May – Kwomtari for details.

Foley (2018)
Foley (2018) provides the following classification.

Momu (Fas), Baibai
Guriaso
Kwomtari, Nai-Biaka
Pyu

Foley (2018) considers the possibility that each of the four groups may in fact constitute a separate language family of its own. He remains open to the idea that they may be related to each other, though he leaves this question open at the time of publication.

Possible Pyu–Kwomtari pronominal cognates listed by Foley (2018) are:

{| 
|+ Possible Pyu–Kwomtari pronoun cognates
! Pronoun !! Kwomtari !! Pyu
|-
! ‘you (sg)’
| une || no
|-
! ‘we’
| mena || məla
|-
! ‘he/she/it/they’
| nane || na
|}

Pronouns in Momu (Fas) and Kwomtari:

{| 
|+ Kwomtari and Fas pronouns
!  !! Momu !! Kwomtari
|-
! 1s
| te || mene
|-
! 2s
| ai || une
|-
! 3s
| wob || nane
|-
! 1p
| yer || mena
|-
! 2p
| ar || una
|-
! 3p
| nəb || nane
|}

Unlike in many other Papuan languages, nouns in Kwomtari and Fas languages do not have gender, noun classes, or number marking. However, Kwomtari and Fas languages do have case inflection, such as possessive suffixes, some of which are:
-u (Momu)
–u ~ -lu (Kwomtari)

See also
Left May-Kwomtari languages
Papuan languages

References

External links
Kwomtari languages database at TransNewGuinea.org
Wietze Baron, The Kwomtari Phylum (accessed 2011-4-15)

Proposed language families
Languages of Papua New Guinea
Papuan languages

br:Yezhoù kwomtarek
ru:Квомтари-фасские языки